Nant-y-Gollen is a village in Shropshire in England.

References

Villages in Shropshire